The Euschelspass (1,567 m) is a high mountain pass of the Swiss Alps, connecting Schwarzsee with Jaun in the canton of Fribourg. The pass lies on the watershed between the Jogne and the Sense and is located between the Chörblispitz and the Schafberg.

The pass is traversed by a trail.

References

External links
Euschelspass on Hikr

Mountain passes of the Alps
Mountain passes of the canton of Fribourg